The following is a list of notable past pupils and faculty of the Belen Jesuit Preparatory School.

Academics

Entertainers and athletes

Entrepreneurs

Journalists

Politicians in Cuba

Politicians in the United States

Priests

Scientists

Sources

External links
 Belen Jesuit Celebrates 25yrs of Humanitarian Missions
 Belen Jesuit homepage
 Education, Faith & Discipline; Belen Jesuit Celebrates its 150th Anniversary
 Privateschoolreview.com's page on Belen
 The Miami New Times; May 10, 2001; "Class Act: If You Want to Know Where Many of Miami's Social and Political Elite Got Their Start, Check the Playgrounds at Belen" by Gaspar Gonzalez 

Alumni by high school in Florida
Lists of American people by school affiliation
Lists of people by educational affiliation in Florida
People by educational institution in Cuba
Belen Jesuit Preparatory School